VIP Brother 8, also known as VIP Brother: Играта загрубява (lit. The game gets rough)  was eighth season of the Bulgarian reality television series VIP Brother, hosted by Niki Kanchev. The show launched on 11 September 2016 on Nova TV. Niki Kanchev and Aleksandra Sarchadjieva were the main presenters. It concluded 62 days later on 11 November 2016. Miglena Angelova won with Petar Bachvarov "Uti" as the runner-up.

It marked 10 years since the premiere of the VIP Brother format in Bulgaria in 2006.

Housemates
17 Housemates entered the House on Day 1 and another one on Day 13. Hristo entered on Day 30.

Aleksandar 

Aleksandar Nikolov "Alek Sandar" is a music producer and musician. He entered the house on Day 1 and was the first evicted on Day 13.

Borislav   
Borislav Komsiyski is a businessman. He entered the house on Day 1 and finished fourth in the finale on Day 62.

Desislava 
Desislava Tsoneva "Desi" is a TV host and daughter of popular journalist Dimitar Tsonev. She entered the house on Day 1 and was the eighth evicted on Day 55.

Emilia 
Emilia Tsvetkova "Emanuela" is a pop-folk singer. She entered the house on Day 13 and finished third in the finale on Day 62.

Georgi S. 
Georgi Sofkin is an Olympic champion in badminton. He entered the house on Day 1 and decided to walk out of the House on Day 9.

Georgi T.  
Georgi Tornev is a director of popular shows on BNT Ku-ku and Kanaleto. His wife Mira Dobreva entered two years later in VIP Brother 10 in 2018. He entered the house on Day 1 and was the sixth evicted on Day 48.

Gloria 
Gloria Petkova is a model. She entered the house on Day 1 and was the second evicted on Day 34.

Hristo 

Hristo Zhivkov is an actor. He entered the house on Day 30 and finished fifth in the finale on Day 62.

Irina 
Irina Tencheva is a TV host and wife of popular TV host and producer Ivan Hristov. She entered the house on Day 1 and was the ninth evicted on Day 58.

Lazara 
Lazara Zlatareva "Kaka Lara" (Sister Lara) is a TV host of popular childer show "Milion i edno zhelania" ("Million and one wishes") and an actress. She entered the house on Day 1 and was the third evicted on Day 41.

Lilia 
Lilia Vuchkova "Kaka Lili" (Sister Lili) is a TV host of popular childer shows "Sedem dni za vas deca" ("Seven days for your children"), "Muzikalna chudnoteka" ("Music chudnoteka"), "Nedelno mejduchasie" ("Sunday break") and original TV host of "Milion i edno zhelania" ("Million and one wishes") and an actress. She entered the house on Day 1 and was the tenth evicted on Day 58.

Miglena 
Miglena Angelova is a TV host of former popular talk show "Iskreno i lichno" ("Sincerely and personally"). She entered the house on Day 1 and became a winner on Day 62.

Nadezhda 
Nadezhda Ivanova "Nadya" is an actress and TV host of former secular show on BNT "Elit". She entered the house on Day 1 and was the seventh evicted on Day 55.

Petar 
Petar Bachvarov "Uti" is a TV host of first culinary show "Barzo, lesno, vkusno" ("Fast, easy, delicious") started in 1997 and an actor. He entered the house on Day 1 and finished second in the finale on Day 62.

Radoslav 
Radoslav Kavaldzhiev "Roro" is a producer, TV host a defunct music channel MM and son of the popular rock singer Vili Kavaldzhiev. He entered the house on Day 1 and was the fifth evicted on Day 48.

Reni 
Reni Gaytandjieva is a pop-folk singer. She is the only pop-folk singer managed to break into two countries - Bulgaria and Serbia. She entered the house on Day 1 and was the twelfth evicted on Day 61.

Valentin 

Valentin Mihov "Valyo" is a former footballer, football functionary and businessman. He entered the house on Day 1 and was the eleventh evicted on Day 60.

Yavor 
Yavor Baharov is an actor. He entered the house on Day 1 and was ejected on Day 27.

Zhana 

Zhana Brankova-Bergendorff is a pop singer and the winner of second season of X Factor. She entered the house on Day 1 and was the fourth evicted on Day 41.

Houseguests

Mike 

On September 10 it was officially announced that Mike Tyson would enter the House. On September 26, Niki Kanchev announced that it would enter the house.  He entered the House on Day 23 as a special Houseguest and left on Day 26.

Nominations table

Notes 

 : Initially, Borislav and Yavor were nominated by the mission of Zhana "Secret boss of the house, but after the end, they are immunized from nominations (including Zhana, who cope successfully with the mission).
 : For the first time nominations are held by voting on Facebook.
 : Eviction was cancelled after having Yavor decides to leave the house on his own. 
 : For the first time nominations are held a completely new regulation for transmission in which luck plays a major role and housemates in pairs of two or three. Lilia is immune at the end of the show and it makes sure the first finalist. She is the only housemate who gave 2 points between the nominations.
 : Miglena and Zhana were originally nominated, but after the sector fell "save and nominate another" they were saved from the nominations and had to indicate another participant from outside the list of nominees. Emilia stayed in the nomination because it fell on the sector "nominated" and she had to nominate another participant outside the list of the nominees.
 : Initially Emilia and Miglena were nominated, but after voting on Facebook they gathered most like-es of their photos and they were saved.
 : During the seventh and final nominations, the housemates had to first vote for who they wanted to win (the name in ) and second for who they didn't want to win (the name in black). They were not able to vote for themselves.
 : During the last nominations for the season Desislava, Nadezhda and Reni did not receive any support from other participants (or "most worthy" or "most unworthy" to win the show) and were nominated participants who are most unworthy to win.

References

External links
 Official website

2016 Bulgarian television seasons
VIP 8
2016 Bulgarian television series endings